Hatzidakis or Hadjidakis is a Greek surname, a diminutive of Hatzis:

 Georgios Hatzidakis (1843–1941), linguist
 Hatzidakis (athlete), shooter in the 1896 Olympics
 Ioannis Hatzidakis (1844–1921), mathematician
 Kostis Hatzidakis (born 1965), conservative politician
 Manos Hatzidakis (1925–1994), composer
 Nikolaos Hatzidakis (1872–1942), mathematician

Greek-language surnames
Surnames